Collagen alpha-1(XVI) chain is a protein that in humans is encoded by the COL16A1 gene.

Function 

This gene encodes the alpha chain of type XVI collagen, a member of the FACIT collagen family (fibril-associated collagens with interrupted helices). Members of this collagen family are found in association with fibril-forming collagens such as type I and II, and serve to maintain the integrity of the extracellular matrix. High levels of type XVI collagen have been found in fibroblasts and keratinocytes, and in smooth muscle and amnion.

References

Further reading

External links 
 

Collagens